The United Left (ZL) was a political and electoral alliance of political parties in Poland.

The alliance was formed in July 2015 by the Democratic Left Alliance (SLD), Your Movement (TR), Polish Socialist Party (PPS), Labour United (UP), and  The Greens (PZ) to jointly contest the forthcoming parliamentary election. The formation of the alliance was in response to the poor performance the Polish centre-left in the 2015 presidential election, and was backed by the All-Poland Alliance of Trade Unions (OPZZ). On 14 September 2015 the Polish Labour Party (PPP) joined the alliance. On 4 October 2015, it was announced that Barbara Nowacka, co-leader of TR, would be the alliance's leader and prime ministerial candidate.

In the 2015 parliamentary election on 25 October 2015, the ZL received 7.6% of the vote, below the 8% electoral threshold for electoral alliances (individual parties only need 5%), leaving the alliance without any parliamentary representation. ZL was dissolved in February 2016. The alliance was succeeded for the 2019 parliamentary election by The Left.

References

External links
Official website  

2015 establishments in Poland
2016 disestablishments in Poland
Defunct left-wing political party alliances
Defunct political party alliances in Poland
Defunct social democratic parties in Poland
Democratic Left Alliance
Political parties disestablished in 2016
Political parties established in 2015